Avatar Repertory Theater commonly known as ART, is a theatre troupe that performs primarily in the virtual world Second Life, though they have recently extended to other virtual platforms such as OSGrid and Kitely.

Activities

 the troupe's Web site listed seventeen members, each working within multiple different fields. The primary focus of troupe members is  voice acting, However some of the other areas of performance the troupe has skills in are:programming, graphics arts, sound creation, recording and editing, script writing, direction, video capture, production etc. The actors however do not have to be trained in all of these areas. Yet the freedom of the Virtual World means that everyone can contribute to the process.
The ability of an actor to be able to move their avatar smoothly in the virtual environment while performing their lines is also essential. This kind of "puppeteering" is difficult to do well, making it much harder to perform live theatre in a virtual environment than in the physical one.

One of the main aims of the company is to allow live theatre to connect both Performers and Audiences within a virtual space and - where possible and appropriate - to fully immerse the audience in the production. For example; during the production of Alice in WonderSLand, the audience avatars would sit on seats specially scripted (i.e. programmed) so that when certain things happened, like Alice falling down the rabbit hole, the audience would find themselves suddenly up in the air and flailing with Alice. This immersive form of theatre is relatively impossible to achieve in the physical world, and audiences in the virtual world enjoy becoming a part of the production. Unlike most Theatre groups, ART hires their actors based on the quality of Voice Acting, since the physical aspects of theatre are much different in a virtual environment. It is therefore more rigorous for an actor as she or he must be able to present a character almost solely on the quality of their vocal performance. range and variety are essential to the virtual actor.

Something that allows A.R.T to be so successful is the ability to use the extensive creativity of the Virtual World.
In their performance Alice through the looking Glass, the visuals for the show were inspired from the original artworks of John Tenniel, and many of the avatars were created using those drawings as templates. The freedom of the virtual world means that ART can more accurately create the costumes and sets from original concept designs.

History
A.R.T. was founded in 2008 by Second Lifers Adaradiuss and Sodovan Torok (Judith Adele and Iain McCracken, respectively). Many of the members in the company met performing together in other theatrical events in Second Life.

A.R.T. started off by touring various different theatrical performances through a variety of different simulators before finally settling on their Virtual space in which they created The New Theater, which is where the group continues to perform.
The first show they did was written by members of Second Life and the story was about things that happened in Second Life, making the play completely unique to the Virtual world. 
This show was called Tales of the Metaverse.

The aim of A.R.T. is to continue to refine live theatre in online Virtual Reality platforms, and to eventually create cross reality performance by combining virtual and physical environments as well as to create quality machinima (recorded real time animation) of their shows.

Past performances
This is a partial list
Shakespeare's Titus Andronicus (single performance in 2012)
Mr. Sycamore, adapted from the Robert Ayres novella (single performance in 2012)
Shakespeare's The Merry Wives of Windsor (single performance in 2012)
Alice Through the Looking Glass, adapted from the Lewis Carroll novel (2011)
Virtual Short Play Buffet Original works by various playwrights (2011)
Oedipus Rex, by Sophocles (2010/2011)
Alice in WonderSLand, adapted from the Lewis Carroll novel (2010)
Howard Barker 13 Objects: Studies in Servitude as part of the 21for21 Barker Festival (2010)
Shakespeare's The Tempest (2009)
Tales from Metaverse, original works by various playwrights  (2008)

Governance 

ART is a project of New Media Arts, Inc., which is a nonprofit corporation registered in the US. The official website has the following in the sidebar of its public pages:

References

External links

Event Calendar

Second Life
Theatre companies